Marie Orav (23 December 1911, Pikeliai, Telšiai County, Russian Empire – 4 January 1994, Tallinn) was an Estonian chess player, who twice won the Estonian Women's Chess Championship - 1952, 1959.

Biography
In 1929 Marie Orav graduated from gymnasium in Tartu. Marie Orav was one of the first women chess players in Estonia in the 1930s. In 1937 she won Tallinn Chess Championship for women. In 1938 she was first of the Estonian who participated in international women chess tournament.
In 1945 Marie Orav lost the Estonian Women's Championship title match to Salme Rootare - 6½:7½.
In Estonian Chess Championships for women she has won 2 gold (1952, 1959), 5 silver (1945, 1948, 1954, 1958, 1960) and 3 bronze (1950, 1956, 1957) medals. Marie Orav played for Estonia in Soviet Team Chess Championship in 1959. By the end of life participated in the chess tournaments. She worked in the food industry.

References

External links
 player profile at olimpbase.org (Soviet Team Chess Championship)

1911 births
1994 deaths
People from Telshevsky Uyezd
Estonian female chess players
Soviet female chess players
20th-century chess players
Burials at Metsakalmistu